This is a list of record labels owned by Sony BMG Music Entertainment.

Columbia Records
Aware Records
Burgundy Records
Chaos Recordings
C2 Records
LBW Entertainment
Loud Records

Epic Records
Caribou Records
Daylight Records
550 Music
Ruthless Records
WTG Records
The Work Group

Federation Records

GUN Records

Kinetic Records

Legacy Recordings
Windham Hill Records
Private Music

Ode Records

Ravenous Records

RCA Music Group
RCA Records
Arista Records
J Records
Full Surface Records
US Records
Polo Grounds Music
Bluebird Records
Phonogenic Records

Provident Music Group
Brentwood Records
Benson Records
Essential Records
Flicker Records
Beach Street Records
Reunion Records
Praise Hymn Music Group
Provident Special Markets
Provident-Integrity Distribution

RED Distribution
Cashville Records
Red Ink Records

Sony BMG Nashville
Open Wide
Arista Nashville
BNA Records
RCA Nashville
Columbia Nashville

Sony BMG Masterworks
Masterworks Broadway Records
Playbill Records
RCA Victor Red Seal Records
Sony Classical
Sony Broadway
Odyssey Records
Arte Nova Classics
Deutsche Harmonia Mundi
Sony Wonder

Zomba Music Group
Battery Records
Epidemic Records
La Face Records
Jive Records
Music for Nations Records
Pinnacle Records
Scotti Brothers Records
Silvertone Records
Verity Records
Volcano Records/Zoo Records
X-Cell Records

BMG Japan
Sony Discos
TriStar Music

Independent labels distributed by Sony BMG
Almost Gold Recordings
BNM Records
SME-Columbia CBS Records
Century Music Malaysia
Dancing Cat Records 
Hollywood Records
D-Town Records
GOOD Music
Gun Records
Deutsche Harmonia Mundi
Independiente Records
Nick Records
NotNowMum! Records
One Records
Platinum Star Records
Rukus Avenue
Shout! Factory
Skint Records
Thrive Records
Thugtertainment
Wind-up Records

See also

 List of Sony Music Entertainment labels

Sony
Sony BMG